Emilio Colón (born in Puerto Rico) is an American solo cellist, chamber musician, conductor, composer and pedagogue. He is an international artist, concertizing in Canada, Costa Rica, Colombia, Ecuador, France, Italy, Germany, Guatemala, Hungary, Japan, Korea, Malta, the Netherlands, Puerto Rico, Spain, Switzerland, and the United States.

Career 

The critically acclaimed cellist, Emilio Colón, has been described in prose as“ his playing is full of life and warmth”  by the American Record Guide has praised his performance as “lively, exciting, expressive and absolutely beautiful.” Fanfare Magazine wrote of the cellist, “Emilio Colón is obviously a virtuoso with taste.” Emilio was awarded the “2017 Artist of the Year” by the New York Classical Music Society. 

Performing throughout the world, Emilio has been invited as soloist with the Reno Chamber Orchestra, Casals Festival, National Symphony of the Ukraine, Istanbul State Symphony Orchestra, İzmir State Symphony Orchestra, Antalya Symphony Orchestra,  International Symphony Orchestra of Lviv, Guayaquil Symphony Orchestra, Puerto Rico Symphony Orchestra, Guayaquil Philharmonic Orchestra, Huntsville Symphony Orchestra, Classical Orchestra of Guatemala, Bozeman Symphony and San Angelo Symphony; recitalist for Shanghai Oriental Arts Center in China, Nevada Chamber Music Festival, L’Hermitage Foundation and Bruman Summer Concerts in Los Angeles, Associazione Contrappunto in Tuscany, Tons Voisin Festival in Albi, France, La Musica International Chamber Festival in Sarasota, Florida, Mill Valley Chamber Music Society, Round Top International Festival Institute, Miami Music Festival, Chamber Music Unbound in California and recital tours throughout Europe and Asia. 

Colón's recordings are featured on the Enharmonic, Centaur, Zephyr, and Lyras labels. Colón currently records for Klavier as solo cellist, chamber musician, conductor, and composer under the label.Colón's arrangements, editions and original compositions are published by Masters Music Publications and H.P. Music Publications.

As the second youngest faculty member to be appointed in the history of the Jacobs School of Music at Indiana University, Colón is also known as a pedagogue. He has offered courses at the Conservatoire de Paris, the Geneva Conservatoire, the Franz Liszt Academy of Music, and Toho Gakuen in Tokyo. He is also on faculty at the International Festival-Institute at Round Top in Texas and Chamber Music Unbound at the Mammoth Lakes Music Festival in California.

As President of the American Cello Institute, he is the founder and artistic director of its main project, the International Chamber Orchestra of Puerto Rico. A 501(c)3 non-profit organization, it has won consecutive awards from the National Endowment for the Arts, National Endowment for the Humanities, and Puerto Rican Foundation for the Humanities, and awards from the Titin Foundation and Flamboyan Foundation for providing free access to the arts through concerts, young artist fellowships and outreach events for underserved communities in Puerto Rico and throughout the Caribbean, US and Canada through educational televised programming.

As host and producer of the television series “Beethoven in the Caribbean” and “Music and Puerto Rico,” Emilio is an advocate of making classical music accessible and engaging in the digital world, appearing on CBS Puerto Rico, ABC USVI, NBC and the CW in markets in Puerto Rico, Caribbean, USA, Canada & Guam.

Education 
Colón received a bachelor's degree from the Puerto Rico Conservatory of Music in 1986 as a student of Joaquín Vidaechea, where he won the Pablo Casals Medal upon graduation. As a student and teaching assistant to the distinguished cellist and pedagogue Janos Starker, Colón earned a master's degree from the Indiana University Jacobs School of Music in 1989. He won first prize at the Las Americas Festival Solo Competition. Colón plays on an Amati Cello from 1690 and a Dominique Peccatte bow.

The given name of Emilio Colón is Emilio Waldo Colón. Colón, or Professor Colón, as he is affectionately called by his students at Indiana University.

Recordings 

 Title: Esencia,  Klavier label

Co-producer for the album, arranger, and cello soloist

Description: All new arrangements by Emilio Colón for cello and piano

Program: 
Lecuona: Danzas Afro-Cubanas
Ginastera: Danzas Argentinas
Piazzolla: Nuevo Tango:
Oblivion, Tzigane Tango, Milonga del Angel, Muerte del Angel
Danzas Célebres Puertorriqueñas
Morel Campos: Felices Días
Mislán: Tu y Yo
Miranda: Impromptu, Op.10 
Colón: Armando's Waltz for Cello and Piano (premiere)

Title: Alma Latina, The Latin Soul of the Cello, Klavier label, international distribution

Emilio Colón, cello and Sung Hoon Mo, Piano. Cello and piano pieces from Spain and Latin America

Program: 
Ginastera: Pampeana No. 2, Op. 21
Ponce (arr. Cassadó): Estrellita
Falla (arr. Colón): Siete Canciones Populares 
Españolas
Piazzolla: Le Grand Tango
Villa-Lobos: Pequena Suite
Morel-Campos (arr. Colón): Bella Illusión
Tavárez (arr. Colón): Un Recuerdito
Danza capricho
Turina (arr. Colón): Tres Sonetos, Op. 54: 
1. Anhelos (Desires)
Sarasate (arr. Colón): Zigeunerweisen, Op. 20

Title: Obseción, Klavier label

Emilio Colón: Co-producer for the album, cellist, arranger, composer

Trio Amadé debut recording

Program: Copland: Vitebsk
Bernstein: Trio
Piazzolla: Las Cuatro Estaciones Porteñas 
Colón: “N” Tango for Piano Trio

Compositions 

 Poeme: La Garza en El Daule (2022)
Inspired by the river Daule in Guayaquil which serves as a source of life, energy and beauty for the people and creatures in Ecuador, including the beautiful and unique bird, La Garza.
Comissioned by Don Ramón Sonnenholzner

 Los Jolgoriosos (2007)

Salmetón para Violin y Piano

Dedication: for Jessica Mathaes on the occasion of her Cuypers 200th birthday; 
inspirado por mis queridos amigos Rafi y Ramonita

Premiered on December 9, 2007 by Jessica Mathaes & Rick Rowley at Bates Recital Hall in Austin, Texas.

 Los Niños y las Minarets (2007)
Suite Miniatura para Violin, Cello y Piano

 Ari y Sofía: El Juego de las Sillas
 Bodie at Horshoe Lake
 Erratics
 Iris y Naomi: Libros de Niños
 Ana y Elisa: Par' de Camisas

Commissioned by Ellen Siegal and the Felici Trio

Dedication: A mis queridos amigos The Felicio Trio y Ellen Siegal

Premiered on August 1, 2007 by the Felici Trio at the Mammoth Lakes Festival in California

 Dana la Colorá (2007)
For Double Bass & Piano

Commissioned by James Vandemark

Dedication: A mi querido amigo JB and his lovely daughter Dana

Premiered on June 9, 2007 at the International Festival-Institute in Roundtop Texas by James Vandemark and Nariaki Sugiura

 Recuerdos de Tata (2007)
Poemas Borincanos para Cello y Orquesta

 La Casa Grande: La Casa Vieja de Maresúa
 Tinayarí
 Bonita
 El Combate

Commissioned by the Bloomington Symphony Orchestra

Dedication: A lamemoria de dos seres queridos Elsie Ramírez de Roque y Evelina Cucalón de Fougeres

Premiered on May 4, 2007 by Emilio Colón and the Bloomington Symphony Orchestra, Thomas Lowenheim, conductor

 Antecedentes (2005)
For Cello & Piano as companions to Armando's Waltz
Premiered on April 10, 2005 recital at the Centro de Bellas Artes in San Juan, Puerto Rico

Doña Bele y Don Enrique
Armando's Waltz
Pambel

 Armando's Waltz (2002)
For Cello and String Quartet

 “N” Tango for Violin, Cello, and Piano (2001)

Premiered by Trio Amadé on 8/23/2001 at the Sommerabendmusik Series, St. Paul's Episcopal Church, Delray Beach, Fl

Recorded by Trio Amadé for Klavier Records 8/2001

 Renaten Satz (1995)

For Cello and String Quartet

Commissioned by and premiered at the Cedar Arts Forum String Camp, Waterloo, IA

 Romanza Para Emma (1995)

For Cello and String Quartet

 Tres Recuerdos (1994)

For Piano Trio and String Orchestra

Commissioned by and premiered at the Cedar Arts Forum String Camp, Waterloo, IA

 Fantasías Boricuas (1987)

For violin and piano

Guánica
Jíbaro
Impro sobre un seis
Madre

 Pena en Frustración (1986)
Prelude for Piano

 Amor: Tu y Dos Cuadros (1986)
For medium voice and piano

 Pensamiento (1985)
Prelude for Piano

El Ladrón (1985)
For medium voice and piano

References

External links
 Official website
 Indiana University Jacob School of Music Faculty Profile
 ICOPR Official website
 International Festival Institute at Roundtop Faculty Profile

Year of birth missing (living people)
Living people
American cellists
American male composers
21st-century American composers
American male conductors (music)
Indiana University faculty
American people of Puerto Rican descent
21st-century American conductors (music)
21st-century American male musicians
21st-century cellists